The Heywood Chair Factory was a manufacturing facility for bentwood chairs built at 1010-1014 Race St. between N. 10th and N. 11 Streets in 1892 in what is now the Chinatown neighborhood of Philadelphia.  It has been converted into condominiums, and was listed on the National Register of Historic Places in 1984.

See also

 National Register of Historic Places listings in Center City, Philadelphia

References
Notes

External links

Industrial buildings and structures on the National Register of Historic Places in Philadelphia
Renaissance Revival architecture in Pennsylvania
Industrial buildings completed in 1892
Chinatown, Philadelphia
Chair-making